Bronze man and centaur is an 8th century BC bronze sculpture, created in Greece during the mid-8th century BC, in the period of Archaic Greece. It is now in the collection of the Metropolitan Museum of Art.

The sculpture was a posthumous gift of J. Pierpont Morgan given to the Metropolitan Museum in 1917.

Description 
The work depicts a man and centaur embracing. The bottom of the sculpture contains a geometric pattern.

References 

Created via preloaddraft
Sculptures of the Metropolitan Museum of Art
Sculptures of classical mythology
Archaic Greek sculptures
Centaurs